Hawulti is a pre-Aksumite obelisk located in Matara, Eritrea. The monument bears the oldest known example of the ancient Ge'ez script.

Description 

These pre-Christian symbols, as well as paleographical characteristics such as the lack of vowel marks in the Ge'ez script, convinced Ullendorff that the monument dated "to the early part of the fourth century A.D."

Ullendorff translated of the inscription as follows:
  This is the obelisk which had  made 
 'Agaz for his fathers who have 
 carried off the youth of ‘W’
 ‘LF as well as of SBL.
His translation differs from Enno Littmann at several points. First, Littmann believed the third line referred to the digging of canals nearby (his translation, "zog die Kannaele von `Aw`a") despite the lack of any signs of canals or ditches in the area; Ullendorff argues that the verb s-h-b in the inscription should be translated as "to drag along, to capture". Second, he believed the nouns — ‘W’, ‘LF, and SBL — were placenames, and based on discussions with local informants Ullendorff identified them with nearby communities: the earlier name of Baraknaha, the site of a 12th-century church 17 kilometers from Matara, had been subli, and the equally well-known Orthodox church at Gunda Gunde, 22 kilometers from Matara, had once been known as Aw`a 'ilfi.

Modern history 

When Littmann, leader of the Deutsche Aksum-Expedition, found the Hawulti, it had been pushed over and broken in half in the distant past. The Italian colonial government had the broken monument repaired with two iron bars and set upright in what thought to be its proper location, but its exact original location is not known for sure.

The Hawulti was toppled and damaged by Ethiopian troops in the short occupation of southern Eritrea during the Eritrean-Ethiopian War. It has since been repaired by the National Museum of Eritrea.

See also
Ezana Stone
King Ezana's Stela
Monolithic architecture
Yeha

References

External links
The Hawulti
AFP: Eritrea rebuilds country's symbolic stone pillar

6th-century BC inscriptions
History of Eritrea
History of Ethiopia
Axumite obelisks
Monuments and memorials in Eritrea
Archaeology of Eastern Africa